Pablo Matías Daniel Molina (born 13 June 1993) is an Argentine professional footballer who plays as a right-back for Atlanta.

Club career
Molina's career started with Tristán Suárez. His first appearance arrived in December 2012 against Los Andes, which began a run of eight appearances in Primera B Metropolitana for the defender in 2012–13. In 2013–14, Molina scored the first two goals of his senior career after netting versus Flandria and Barracas Central respectively. He made a total of ninety-two appearances and scored four goals in five seasons with the club. In July 2016, Molina moved up to Primera B Nacional after penning a loan deal with Gimnasia y Esgrima. He featured seventeen times for them as they placed eighteenth in tier two.

After twenty-four games and one goal back with Tristán Suárez, Molina left on 30 June 2018 to sign for fellow Primera B Metropolitana team Atlanta. He made his debut against his former club, playing the full duration of a 4–0 victory over Tristán Suárez on 18 August. Molina played for Atlanta until February 2021, where he joined Sarmiento. However, he returned to Atlanta in January 2022.

International career
Ahead of the 2016 Sait Nagjee Trophy in India, Molina was called up by Julio Olarticoechea's Argentina U23s.

Career statistics
.

References

External links

1993 births
Living people
People from Ezeiza, Buenos Aires
Argentine footballers
Association football defenders
Primera B Metropolitana players
Primera Nacional players
CSyD Tristán Suárez footballers
Gimnasia y Esgrima de Jujuy footballers
Club Atlético Atlanta footballers
Club Atlético Sarmiento footballers
Sportspeople from Buenos Aires Province